William Gerald Minson (born 11 April 1985) is a former professional Australian rules footballer who played for the Western Bulldogs in the Australian Football League (AFL).

Early life
Minson grew up in Norwood, South Australia and played football with the Norwood Football Club up until the under 18's.

He was a student at St Peter's College, Adelaide, where he played the majority of his junior football, while also playing as a junior footballer at Walkerville FC.

AFL career
The Western Bulldogs recruited Minson in the 2002 AFL Draft at pick number 20. He made his debut with the club in 2004.

He was known for his physical presence, being suspended for striking Geelong star Cameron Ling in just his second game.

In round 14 2008, with the Bulldogs playing Port Adelaide in their annual game in Darwin, Minson was involved in a confrontation with Kane Cornes, a Port Adelaide midfielder.  Minson appeared two days later in an interview with the Foxtel AFL program On the Couch, apologising on the couch for a derogatory comment made to Cornes. The actual comment is said to have concerned or been directed towards Kane's newborn son who has suffered from health problems, and in particular questioning Kane's priorities in choosing to play football in Darwin that weekend, rather than being back in Adelaide in support of his wife and son. Minson claimed that what was said was in "the heat of battle".

In round 12 2012, following the Western Bulldogs' victory over Port Adelaide, Minson was again embroiled in a controversy over allegedly sledging Danyle Pearce, another Port Adelaide player. The comments, which are said to have concerned Pearce's mother, were made in the final quarter of the match, immediately after the two were wrestling at a stoppage and during a subsequent melee. Whilst the incident was not elevated to the AFL tribunal, the Western Bulldogs fined Minson and imposed a one-week suspension on him as punishment for the silly indiscretion. Because of the prior incident with Kane Cornes, a media frenzy ensued. In a press conference two days after the game, Minson said he was "deeply regretful for any comments that were made", and that he had "no intention of ever putting anyone through that again".

In October 2016, Minson announced he would no longer be playing for the Western Bulldogs and he would explore his options during the free-agency period. After failing to find a new club during the free-agency period, he was subsequently delisted by the Western Bulldogs.

Statistics

|- style="background-color: #EAEAEA"
! scope="row" style="text-align:center" | 2004
|
| 27 || 5 || 1 || 1 || 10 || 7 || 17 || 4 || 4 || 37 || 0.2 || 0.2 || 2.0 || 1.4 || 3.4 || 0.8 || 0.8 || 7.4
|-
! scope="row" style="text-align:center" | 2005
|
| 27 || 17 || 4 || 4 || 86 || 64 || 150 || 33 || 52 || 207 || 0.2 || 0.2 || 5.1 || 3.8 || 8.8 || 8.8 || 1.9 || 12.2
|- style="background-color: #EAEAEA"
! scope="row" style="text-align:center" | 2006
|
| 27 || 13 || 8 || 4 || 58 || 46 || 104 || 25 || 24 || 131 || 0.6 || 0.3 || 4.5 || 3.5 || 8.0 || 1.9 || 1.8 || 10.1
|-
! scope="row" style="text-align:center" | 2007
|
| 27 || 6 || 0 || 1 || 26 || 22 || 48 || 8 || 13 || 73 || 0.0 || 0.2 || 4.3 || 3.7 || 8.0 || 1.3 || 2.2 || 12.2
|- style="background-color: #EAEAEA"
! scope="row" style="text-align:center" | 2008
|
| 27 || 25 || 19 || 11 || 175 || 91 || 266 || 88 || 58 || 313 || 0.8 || 0.4 || 7.0 || 3.6 || 10.6 || 3.5 || 2.3 || 12.5
|-
! scope="row" style="text-align:center" | 2009
|
| 27 || 25 || 16 || 4 || 143 || 165 || 308 || 89 || 70 || 365 || 0.6 || 0.2 || 5.7 || 6.6 || 12.3 || 3.6 || 2.8 || 14.6
|- style="background-color: #EAEAEA"
! scope="row" style="text-align:center" | 2010
|
| 27 || 15 || 8 || 7 || 88 || 75 || 163 || 48 || 32 || 197 || 0.5 || 0.5 || 5.9 || 5.0 || 10.9 || 3.2 || 2.1 || 13.1
|-
! scope="row" style="text-align:center" | 2011
|
| 27 || 9 || 6 || 2 || 62 || 49 || 111 || 32 || 23 || 167 || 0.7 || 0.2 || 6.9 || 5.4 || 12.3 || 3.6 || 2.6 || 18.6
|- style="background-color: #EAEAEA"
! scope="row" style="text-align:center" | 2012
|
| 27 || 21 || 4 || 6 || 138 || 154 || 292 || 57 || 67 || bgcolor="CFECEC"| 667 || 0.2 || 0.3 || 6.6 || 7.3 || 13.9 || 2.7 || 3.2 || 31.8
|-
! scope="row" style="text-align:center" | 2013
|
| 27 || 22 || 7 || 5 || 152 || 168 || 320 || 40 || 81 || bgcolor="DD6E81"| 860 || 0.3 || 0.2 || 6.9 || 7.6 || 14.5 || 1.8 || 3.7 || bgcolor="DD6E81"| 39.1
|- style="background-color: #EAEAEA"
! scope="row" style="text-align:center" | 2014
|
| 27 || 21 || 4 || 6 || 144 || 108 || 252 || 33 || 81 || 757 || 0.2 || 0.3 || 6.9 || 5.1 || 12.0 || 1.6 || 3.9 || 36.0
|-
! scope="row" style="text-align:center" | 2015
|
| 27 || 10 || 3 || 3 || 62 || 40 || 102 || 17 || 41 || 265 || 0.3 || 0.3 || 6.2 || 4.0 || 10.2 || 1.7 || 4.1 || 26.5
|- style="background-color: #EAEAEA"
! scope="row" style="text-align:center" | 2016
|
| 27 || 2 || 1 || 0 || 9 || 5 || 14 || 1 || 6 || 32 || 0.5 || 0.0 || 4.5 || 2.5 || 7.0 || 0.5 || 3.0 || 16.0
|- class="sortbottom"
! colspan=3| Career
! 191
! 81
! 54
! 1153
! 994
! 2147
! 475
! 552
! 4071
! 0.4
! 0.3
! 6.0
! 5.2
! 11.2
! 2.5
! 2.9
! 21.3
|}

Personal life
Minson has a younger brother, Hugh, who formerly played in the Australian Football League with Port Adelaide before being forced to retire through injury.

Off the field, Minson is known for his multi-faceted abilities - he plays saxophone, speaks fluent German and studied civil engineering at the University of Melbourne. He is also heavily involved with the charity Red Dust, which operates sporting and lifestyle clinics in remote aboriginal communities and, more recently, in very poor areas of India.

References

External links

1985 births
People educated at St Peter's College, Adelaide
Living people
Western Bulldogs players
Norwood Football Club players
Australian people of German descent
Australian rules footballers from South Australia
All-Australians (AFL)